The 1997–98 Kansas Jayhawks men's basketball team represented the University of Kansas in the 1997–98 NCAA Division I men's basketball season, which was the Jayhawks' 100th basketball season. The head coach was Roy Williams, who served his 10th year at KU. The team played its home games in Allen Fieldhouse in Lawrence, Kansas.  They are known for having the distinction of playing an unprecedented 34 regular season games.

Roster

Big 12 Conference standings

Schedule 

|-
!colspan=9 style=| Regular Season
|-

|-

|-
!colspan=9 style=| Big 12 Tournament

|-
!colspan=9 style=| NCAA tournament

Rankings 

*There was no coaches poll in week 1.

References 

Kansas Jayhawks men's basketball seasons
Kansas
Kansas Jayhawks men's basketball
Kansas Jayhawks men's basketball
Kansas